Rap Album Two is the fifth studio album by American hip hop artist Jonwayne. It was released on February 17, 2017, by Jonwayne's own imprint Authors Recording Company and Daddy Kev's The Order Label.

Background 
The album comes following Jonwayne's hiatus from the music industry, initially presented as a retirement taken while fighting a stint of alcoholism. On December 7, 2016, Jonwayne shared an Open Letter to his fanbase via his Facebook page that detailed his struggles that led to the cancellation of a European Tour and departure from the music industry. This letter concludes with the announcement of Rap Album Two.

Release 
Up until the announcement of the release date for the album, multiple one-off singles were released by Jonwayne to the music sharing site SoundCloud. In order, these include "Wonka," "That's O.K.," "Jump Shot," and "40 Winks." However, he said a month before the release of Rap Album Two that none of the singles would be on the album. Two days after that announcement on January 19, 2017, the first single from the album, "Out of Sight," was released, along with an announcement of the release date of the album. On February 2, Jonwayne released the first track of the album, "TED Talk," as a single. On the day of the album's release, he released a music video for the last track on the album, "These Words Are Everything."

Critical reception 

The album was placed at number 35 on Rolling Stones "40 Best Rap Albums of 2017" list, as well as number 20 on HipHopDXs "Best Rap Albums of 2017" list. Tom Breihan of Stereogum placed it at number 24 on the "40 Best Rap Albums of 2017" list.

Track listing 

Notes
  signifies an additional producer

Personnel 
Credits adapted from the album's liner notes.

Musicians

 Jonwayne – vocals, composer, engineering, arrangement
 Juan Alderete de la Pena – bass guitar 
 Jameel Bruner – keyboards 
 Nick Colletti – composer 
 D-Styles – scratches 
 Kiefer – keyboards 
 Low Leaf – composer, harp 
 Oliver the 2nd – production 
 Patrick Paige II – bass guitar 
 Shane Sakanoi – composer 
 Shango – composer 
 Sofie – strings 
 Danny Watts – composer 
 Zeroh – composer 

Production

 Jonwayne – executive producer, production , additional production 
 Shane Sakanoi – co-executive producer
 Daddy Kev – mixing, mastering
 Dibiase – production 
 DJ Babu – production 
 Eets – production 

Design
 Theo Jemison – photography

References

External links 
 

2017 albums
Jonwayne albums
Albums produced by Dibiase